Toda la sangre is a Mexican crime-thriller streaming television series based on the book of the same name by Bernardo Esquinca. The series stars Aarón Díaz and Ana Brenda Contreras. The series premiered on 15 September 2022 on Pantaya in the United States and Starzplay in Latin America.

Cast

Main 
 Aarón Díaz as Eugenio Casasola
 Ana Brenda Contreras as Edith Mondragón
 Yoshira Escárrega as Elisa
 Clementina Guadarrama
 Julio Casado
 Odiseo Bichir
 Antonio Trejo Sánchez

Recurring 
 Cinthia Vázquez

Episodes

Production 
On 3 August 2020, Toda la sangre was announced as one of Starz's first international original series for its Starzplay streaming service. The series is co-produced with Pantaya, Spiral International and Fremantle. On 3 August 2021, Aarón Díaz and Ana Brenda Contreras were cast in main roles of the series. Filming of the series began on 12 August 2021, and lasted for twelve weeks. On 1 August 2022, it was announced that the series would premiere on 15 September 2022.

References

External links 
 

2022 Mexican television series debuts
Spanish-language television shows
2020s Mexican drama television series